Justyna Porazińska (née Brzozowska) is a Polish diplomat, ambassador to Tunisia (since 2022), chargé d'affaires to Libya (2019–2022).

Life 

Porazińska graduated from Arab studies at the University of Warsaw (1996) and the National School of Public Administration (2004).

In 1995, she started her professional career at the Polish Chamber of Commerce. Between 2001–2002 was a spokesperson for the Łomianki Municipal Office. In 2004, she joined the Ministry of Foreign Affairs. She was responsible for the relations between Poland and the Arab countries of the Gulf at the Department of Africa and the Middle East. From 2005 to 2010 she served as Head of  Political and Economic Section at the Embassy in Damascus. She returned to the Department of Africa and the Middle East, being in charge of the cooperation with the Maghreb. Between 2014 and 2019 as a minister-counsellor she was heading the Political and Economic Unit at the Embassy in Cairo. Since 1 September 2019, she is chargé d’affaires a.i. of the Republic of Poland to the State of Libya, residing in Tunis. On 1 July 2022 she took the post of the ambassador to Tunisia.

She speaks fluently Arabic, English and French. She speaks Italian and Russian, as well.

References 

1970s births
Living people
Ambassadors of Poland to Libya
Ambassadors of Poland to Tunisia
National School of Public Administration (Poland) alumni
University of Warsaw alumni